Camille Lydia Aguilar Villar-Genuino (born January 25, 1985) is a Filipina television personality and politician who currently serves as the Member of the House of Representatives for Las Piñas since 2019. She has been serving as a deputy Speaker since 2022, and was previously in that post from 2021 until 2022 in the 18th Congress.

Early life and education 
Camille Villar was born in Las Piñas, Metro Manila, on January 25, 1985. She is the youngest and only daughter of former President of the Senate Manuel Villar and incumbent Senator Cynthia Villar. One of her older brothers, Senator Mark Villar is another incumbent senator.

Villar studied business management at Ateneo de Manila University. She later obtained a master's degree in business administration at IESE Business School Barcelona Campus.

Career 
Villar used to serve as the Chief Operating Officer of Brittany Corporation. She was the youngest person to hold the position.

Villar was one of the co-hosts of Wil Time Bigtime from 2012 to 2013, as well as a co-host of Wowowillie in 2013; both aired on TV5.

She is also the Managing Director of Vista Land.

Political career 

In the 2019 election, Villar contested as the Nacionalista candidate for Las Piñas's at-large congressional district. She received 89.78% (173,917 votes), defeating her competitor Jerry de los Reyes.

On November 18, 2020, Villar was elected one of the Deputy Speakers of the House of Representatives, but refused the position just after a few hours. However, she was again elected to the same position on February 2, 2021; this time she accepted it.

On July 10, 2020, Villar voted to reject the franchise renewal of ABS-CBN together with 69 other representatives.

Villar was re-elected to her second term as representative in 2022. She once again became one of the Deputy Speakers for the 19th Congress.

Personal life 
Villar married Erwin Genuino, son of former Pagcor chair Efraim Genuino and 2010 Makati mayoral candidate, in 2012. They have a son, named Tristan Emmanuel (born January 2016), and are expecting their second child. She is also the niece of former Mayor of Las Piñas Vergel Aguilar, who was married to incumbent Mayor Imelda Aguilar.

References

External links 
 Camille Villar on Facebook
 Camille Villar  Official Website
 Camille Villar  Congress of the Philippines

1985 births
Living people
Filipino television presenters
21st-century Filipino women politicians
21st-century Filipino politicians
Members of the House of Representatives of the Philippines from Las Piñas
Nacionalista Party politicians
People from Las Piñas
Ateneo de Manila University alumni
TV5 (Philippine TV network) personalities